Soinaste is a village in Kambja Parish, Tartu County, Estonia. It has a population of 557 (as determined in the census of September 1, 2010).

References

Villages in Tartu County